Nectar Amber Rose is an American actress best known for playing the Gynoid Lenore in the science-fiction film Serenity, a role that required her to maintain a single position for two days of filming.

She earned positive reviews for her performance as Eve in the thriller Roman.

Filmography

References

External links

American actresses
1974 births
Living people
Place of birth missing (living people)
21st-century American women